Chirixalus doriae, commonly known as Doria's Asian treefrog, Doria's bush frog, Doria's bush frog, and Doria's tree frog, is a species of frog in the family Rhacophoridae. It is found in southeastern Asia, from extreme northeastern India (Arunachal Pradesh) and adjacent Bangladesh to Myanmar, Thailand, Cambodia, Laos, Vietnam, and southern China (Yunnan, Guangdong, and Hainan).

Etymology
The specific name doriae honours Giacomo Doria, an Italian zoologist.

Habitat and conservation
Its natural habitats are subtropical or tropical moist lowland forest, subtropical or tropical moist montane forest, subtropical or tropical moist shrubland, swamps, freshwater marshes, intermittent freshwater marshes, ponds, irrigated land, and seasonally flooded agricultural land. It is threatened by habitat loss.

References

Chirixalus
Amphibians of Bangladesh
Amphibians of Myanmar
Amphibians of Cambodia
Frogs of China
Frogs of India
Amphibians of Laos
Amphibians of Thailand
Amphibians of Vietnam
Taxa named by George Albert Boulenger
Amphibians described in 1893
Taxonomy articles created by Polbot